Olena Ustymenko Sokolowski (born October 11, 1986) is a Ukrainian female volleyball player.

With her club VakıfBank Türk Telekom Istanbul she competed at the 2011 FIVB Volleyball Women's Club World Championship.

References

External links
 Louisville bio
 profile at FIVB.org

1986 births
Living people
Ukrainian women's volleyball players
Place of birth missing (living people)
Outside hitters
Ukrainian expatriate sportspeople in Turkey
Expatriate volleyball players in Turkey
Louisville Cardinals women's volleyball players